Lalguli falls is a waterfall located at a distance of  from Yellapur in Uttara Kannada district, Karnataka, India. It is named after the nearby Lalguli village. It is fed from the Kali river and is about 250 feet in height with stepped falls inside a forest. The best season to visit is from October to December and during summer it will be dry.

References

Waterfalls of Karnataka
Tourist attractions in Uttara Kannada district
Geography of Uttara Kannada district